To Love a Maori is a 1972 New Zealand film about an interracial romance.
It was the seventh and last feature from Rudall Hayward.

Synopsis
Two young Maori men, Tama and Riki move to Auckland. They then face racial discrimination, especially Tama, when he associates with Penny a Pākehā  whose parents strongly object.

Cast

References

External links

1972 films
1970s New Zealand films
New Zealand drama films
1970s English-language films
Films set in New Zealand
Films about interracial romance
Films about Māori people